Balkan studies or Balkanology is the studies of the Balkans.

Institutions specializing in Balkan studies
Academic
International Association of South-East European Studies (AIESEE)
East European and Balkan Institute, Hankuk University of Foreign Studies, South Korea 
Institute for Balkan Studies, Greece 
Institute for Balkan Studies (or "Balkanological Institute"), Serbia (SANU)
Institute of Balkan Studies and Centre of Thracology, Bulgaria (BAN)
Balkanology Research Center, Bosnia and Herzegovina (ANUBiH)

University 
Centre for Southeast European Studies, University of Graz, Austria
Department of Balkan, Slavic and Oriental Studies, University of Macedonia, Greece
Department of South Slavonic and Balkan Studies , Charles University, Czech Republic
M. Drynov Center for Bulgarian and Balkan Studies, National University of Kharkiv, Ukraine

Notable people

Traian Stoianovich (1921–2005), history
Gustav Weigand (1860–1930), linguistics
Gerhard Gesemann (1888–1948), linguistics
Konstantin Josef Jireček (1854–1918), history, linguistics
Josef Matl (1897–1974), history, linguistics
Ioannis Papadrianos (d. 2009), history
Kristian Sandfeld (1873–1942), linguistics
Vaso Čubrilović (1897–1990), history
Radovan Samardžić (1922–1994), history
Bogdan Petriceicu Hasdeu (1838–1907), linguistics
Dragoljub Dragojlović (b. 1928), philology, history
Boris Shmelev (b. 19××), contemporary geo-politics
Ivan Dorovský (1935–2021), linguistics, slavistics and balkanology

Maria Todorova

See also
Imagining the Balkans
Byzantine studies
Hellenic studies
Albanology
Yugoslav studies

References

Further reading
Palavestra, Aleksandar. "Balkanologija Jovana Cvijića." Istraživač 1 (1981): 13-15.
Lukovič, Miloš. "Balkanistika (balkanologie) v Srbsku v období 1991–2013." Historica-Review in History and Related Sciences 5.1 (2014): 86-104.
Babić, Marko. "Balkanology." (2009).
Burkhart, Dagmar. "Položaj etnologije u balkanologiji: eksplikacija i teze za balkansku etnologiju." Etnološka tribina 15.8 (1985): 5-28.
članova Instituta, Bibliografije, and Zrinka Blažević. "Globaliziranje Balkana: prolegomena za nove balkanske studije."
Lovrenović, Dubravko. "Duž balkanskih historiografskih transverzala." Zeničke sveske-Časopis za društvenu fenomenologiju i kulturnu dijalogiku 03 (2006): 11-20.
Palavestra, Aleksandar. Balkanology, Archaeology and Long-term History. 1994.
Miliori, Margarita. "Ambiguous partisanships. Philhellenism, turkophilia and balkanology in 19th century Britain." Balkanologie. Revue d'études pluridisciplinaires 6.1-2 (2002): 127-153.
Popovici, V. "The rudiments of Balkanology. A step towards Eurolinguistics-German-Reiter, N." (1996): 573-575.
Polome, E. C. "Characteristics of Balkanology: A first look at Eurolinguistics-German-Reiter, N." (1995): 489-490.
Battistella, Edwin, et al. "South Slavic and Balkan Linguistics." (1984): 193-194.
Sawicka, Irena. "Meandry bałkanologii." Slavica Wratislaviensia 159 (2014): 407-411.
Štěpánek, Václav. "Slavistička balkanistika–novi izazovi." (2010).
Orr, Robert, et al. "South Slavic and Balkan Linguistics (Studies in Slavic and General Linguistics, 11)." (1983): 349-351.
Babić, Marko. "Balkanology." (2009).
Papasov, Ivo, et al. Balkanology. Hannibal, 1991.
Nagy, Levente. "Balcanistica hungarica rediviva." Zeitschrift für Balkanologie 39.2 (2003).
Barentsen, Adriaan Arij. South Slavic and Balkan Linguistics. Vol. 1. Rodopi, 1982.